Zhao Guocai (1879–1966) was a Chinese educator and diplomat.

Biography
Zhao was born in Shanghai in 1879. In 1906 he graduated from St. John's University, Shanghai. Zhao was sent abroad to study at the expense of the Qing government. He studied politics at Cornell University and the University of Wisconsin. He returned to China in 1913 and that year became vice-president of Tsinghua University, after the President Tang Guo'an left, he acted as the Acting President. In 1920 he was director of China's educational mission in Washington.

In 1966, Mao Zedong launched the Cultural Revolution, Zhao was mistreated and tortured by the Red Guards, he died in this socialist movement.

References

1879 births
1966 deaths
St. John's University, Shanghai alumni
Cornell University alumni
University of Wisconsin–Madison College of Letters and Science alumni
Educators from Shanghai
Diplomats of the Republic of China
Presidents of Tsinghua University
Victims of the Cultural Revolution